Duck Lake is a small lake in the wetlands on the western shore of the Upper Mississippi River, just north of Lansing, Iowa, in northeastern Allamakee County. It is a part of the New Albin-Big Lake Wildlife Management Area, which itself is surrounded by the Upper Mississippi River National Wildlife and Fish Refuge. It is connected to the Upper Iowa River, but leaks directly to the Big River itself.

Sources
TopoZone
cLocations

Lakes of Iowa
Bodies of water of Allamakee County, Iowa